A list of the most films produced in the Cinema of Mexico ordered by year of release in the 2000s. For an alphabetical list of articles on Mexican films see :Category:Mexican films.

2000
List of Mexican films of 2000

2001
List of Mexican films of 2001

2002
List of Mexican films of 2002

2003
List of Mexican films of 2003

2004
List of Mexican films of 2004

2005
List of Mexican films of 2005

2006
List of Mexican films of 2006

2007
List of Mexican films of 2007

2008
List of Mexican films of 2008

2009
List of Mexican films of 2009

External links
 Mexican films at the Internet Movie Database

Mexican
Films

es:Lista de películas mexicanas
fr:Liste de films mexicains
zh:墨西哥電影列表